Henry Guy may refer to:

Henry Lewis Guy (1887–1956), British mechanical engineer
Henry Guy (politician) (1631–1710), English politician

See also 
Harry Guy (1881–1960), Australian rules footballer
Harry P. Guy (1870–1950), African American ragtime composer

Guy Henry (disambiguation)